Panjgur or Pangor (Balochi and ), transliterated and misspelled in arabic as Bannajbur or Fannazbur  is a small town in Panjgur District, Balochistan. It is known for growing dates. The name drives its origins from blending of two balochi words i.e "Panj" meaning five and "Goran" meaning highland i.e Land of 5 highlands. As the name suggests Panjgur is situated 980 meters above sea level and constitutes the only highland of Makran region. The origins of the word "Goran" are unclear but some scholars believe the name originates from the Avestan word gairi meaning mountain. Additionaly, presence of areas surrounding Panjgur carrying the name Goran, such as Chokgoran meaning "small highland" and Mazangoran "big highland" point to the identical origin of the name. However, it is also contented that the name Panjgur might be a portmanteau of another two balochi words i.e Panj and Goor meaning five graves. 
Panjgur district is known as one of the largest growing regions of Mazafti or Muzati dates, a high quality table date. Panjgur has (circa 27,000 acres) of its lands under the Muzati harvest with estimates that Mazafati accounts for around 10% of Panjgur’s total revenues.

History
Al-Muqaddasī (985 AD) documented that Bannajbur (arabic  was the capital of Makran and that it was populated by people called Balūṣh (Baluch). This is the first known arabic reference to the Baloch people.

Climate

Panjgur has a hot desert climate although milder and cooler than other parts of Makran (Köppen climate classification BWh) with hot summers and cold windy dry winters. Precipitation mainly falls in two distinct periods: in the mid-winter and early spring from late December to March, and in the monsoon in June and July.

Demography

Subdivisions 
The three main modern subdivisions of Panjgur are Gramkān, Qila Khudābadān and Tasp. Historically it was said to be divided into 12 subdivisions which also was the reason for the prefix Dwazdah Shahr e Panjgur meaning 12 Towns of Panjgur.

See also 
 Panjgur District
 Panjgur Airport
 Date palm farming in Pakistan

References

Populated places in Panjgur district